Karolína Elhotová (born January 7, 1992) is a Czech basketball player for USK Praha and the Czech national team.

She participated at the EuroBasket Women 2017.

References

1992 births
Living people
Sportspeople from Prague
Small forwards
Czech women's basketball players